Tomasz Michał Dedek (born 20 September 1957 in Rawa Mazowiecka) is a Polish film and theatre actor.

Biography 
In 1979 he starred in the film Godzina "W" and gained great notoriety by playing the role of a shooter named "Eagle" (pol. Orzeł). In 1981 he graduated from the Acting Department of the Aleksander Zelwerowicz National Academy of Dramatic Art in Warsaw. In the same year he became an actor in the Ateneum Theatre in Warsaw. He also became well known for playing Jędrula Kossoń, Alutka's husband, in Rodzina zastępcza. Dedek currently stars on screen in films and TV series.

On 4 November 2007 Dedek publicly announced his admission to being a secret collaborator of the Służba Bezpieczeństwa (a communist internal security service during the time of the Polish People's Republic) with the nickname "Papkin". Between 1977–1979, he reported on (amongst others) Jerzy Gudejko, Maciej Rayzacher, Krzysztof Kolberger and Piotr Grabowski. He also admitted to accepting money from the SB in exchange for information. His collaboration with the SB formally ended in 1979.

Filmography

1982: Przesłuchanie - UB officer "Czesiek" arresting Tonia
1984: Thais - Cheron
1984: Piotr - Herbert Bielas
1985: Miłość z listy przebojów - Piotr
1989: Labirynt - Waiter in the Empty Restaurant
1992: Czarne Słońca - Wilk
1992: Pigs - Wawro
1993: Schindler's List - Gestapo #1
1994: Dogs 2: The last blood - Wawro
1995: Les Milles - L'homme au Couteau
1995: Pułkownik Kwiatkowski - Sentry commander
1997: Nocne graffiti - Maly
1997: Wezwanie - Militiaman
1997: Sztos
1998: Taekwondo - Sports Club Chairman
1998: Amok
1999: Fuks - The Woman
1999: Pan Tadeusz - Judge's Housemate
2000: Enduro Bojz
2001: Pieniądze to nie wszystko - Dziobaty
2001: Poranek kojota - Maly
2002: Where Eskimos Live
2002: Haker - Adam's father
2003: Pogoda na jutro - Policjant
2005: Siedem grzechów popcooltury - Mojzesz
2009: Generał Nil - General Stanislaw Tatar
2010: Mala matura 1947 - Professor Podkowinski
2013: Bilet na ksiezyc
2016: Historia Roja - Jan Wodzynski

References

External links 
 
 Tomasz Dedek on Filmweb.pl (pol.)
 Tomasz Dedek on filmpolski.pl (pol.)
 Tomasz Dedek on e-teatr.pl (pol.)
 Tomasz Dedek on stopklatka.pl (pol.)
 Tomasz Dedek na zdjęciach on the National Film Archives "Fototeka" (pol.)

Polish male film actors
Polish male stage actors
1957 births
Living people
Polish male television actors
Aleksander Zelwerowicz National Academy of Dramatic Art in Warsaw alumni
People from Rawa Mazowiecka